Podpreska (or Merleinsrauth) is a village in the Municipality of Loški Potok in southern Slovenia. The area is part of the traditional region of Lower Carniola and is now included in the Southeast Slovenia Statistical Region.

References

External links
Podpreska on Geopedia
Pre–World War II list of oeconyms and family names in Podpreska

Populated places in the Municipality of Loški Potok